Cisthene ditrigona is a moth of the family Erebidae. It was described by William Schaus in 1899. It is found in Brazil.

References

Cisthenina
Moths described in 1899